In 2015, the Asian paradise flycatcher was split into the following three species:

 Indian paradise flycatcher (Terpsiphone paradisi)
 Blyth's paradise flycatcher (Terpsiphone affinis)
 Amur paradise flycatcher (Terpsiphone incei)

References

Birds by common name